Carles Sabater i Hernández (September 21, 1962 – February 13, 1999) was a Catalan singer and actor. Alongside an acting career in theatre, television and film, Sabater formed the group Sau with guitarist Pep Sala. Sau became the first rock band singing in Catalan to achieve major commercial success and were one of the key groups of the rock català movement.

Biography

Acting career
Sabater originally planned to study biology at university, but decided to become an actor instead and was admitted to Barcelona's Institut del Teatre. In 1984 he made his debut as an actor in Una jornada particular with Josep Maria Flotats, with whom he subsequently worked on Cyrano de Bergerac. In 1988 he starred in Manuel Huerga's film Gaudí.

Musical career
Sabater met Pep Sala in 1986 while shooting a pilot for TV3.

References

External links
CarlesSabater.com, website in memory of Carles Sabater (in Catalan)
Pep Sala's discography, including Sau albums (in Catalan)

Musicians from Barcelona
Spanish rock singers
1962 births
1999 deaths
20th-century Spanish male singers
20th-century Spanish singers